Hohenfeld is a village in the rural district of Kitzingen, in the Regierungsbezirk of Lower Franconia, Bavaria, Germany.  It is part of the town of Kitzingen.

Villages in Bavaria